Ranfis Javier Encarnación (born 26 January 1996) is a Dominican professional boxer who held the WBA Fedebol featherweight title in 2019. As of May 2020, he is ranked as the world's seventh-best active featherweight by the IBF.

Professional career
Encarnación made his professional debut on 19 December 2014, defeating Juan Rivas via second-round technical knockout (TKO) in Santo Domingo. A year later he won the vacant WBA Fedecaribe bantamweight title in his seventh bout, stopping Angelo Muñoz (15–4, 10 KO) by TKO. In September 2018, the undefeated fighter signed a promotional deal with Sampson Lewkowicz of Sampson Boxing. Two months later, he beat Venezuelan rival Milner Marcano (17–0, 13 KO) in Santo Domingo with a second-round TKO for the vacant WBA Fedecaribe super bantamweight title.

His next fight was his first outside of his homeland: a match-up against Argentine prospect Sergio Martin Sosa (10–1, 3 KO) in Montevideo, Uruguay for the vacant WBA Fedebol featherweight title. He defeated Sosa by unanimous decision (UD) on 26 January 2019 to win his third title in three different weight classes. Three months later he fought on the undercard of the Rances Barthelemy–Robert Easter Jr. world title fight at the Cosmopolitan of Las Vegas, stopping Mexican opponent José Bustos (14–9–3, 9 KO) in the second round to move to 16–0.

Professional boxing record

References

External links
 

Living people
1994 births
Dominican Republic male boxers
Bantamweight boxers
Super-bantamweight boxers
Featherweight boxers
People from San Cristóbal, Dominican Republic